Notagonum pleurale is a species of ground beetle in the subfamily Platyninae. It was described by Karl Jordan in 1894.

References

Notagonum
Beetles described in 1894